Stephen J. Tanner, OOM is the Chief of Police of the Halton Regional Police Service in Ontario, Canada.  He began his term on September 1, 2012, and was sworn in on September 4, 2012, succeeding retired Chief of Police Gary Crowell. Tanner is currently the longest-serving active police chief in Canada, having served in that role for 20 years.

Tanner commenced his policing career on September 13, 1982 with the Halton Regional Police Service. Tanner worked in a variety of areas including uniform patrol, criminal investigations, tactical rescue, training, intelligence, polygraph and major crime. In 1998, he was appointed as Deputy Chief of Operations with the Guelph Police Service where he served until relocating to Belleville Police Service as Deputy Chief in 2000. In 2002, Tanner was appointed as Belleville's Chief of Police. In 2008, Tanner was appointed as Chief of Police of the Kingston Police Force where he served until 2012.

Tanner currently serves as chair of the Criminal Intelligence Service of Ontario and is Co-chair of the National Police Services National Advisory Committee (NPS NAC) which oversees a variety of policing functions for Canada. 

In January 2012, Tanner was appointed by the Governor General of Canada as an Officer of the Order of Merit of the Police Forces.

Education 
Tanner graduated from the University of Guelph in 1982, with a psychology degree and graduated from University of Western Ontario with a master of public administration.

References 
 

Living people
Canadian police chiefs
University of Guelph alumni
University of Western Ontario alumni
Year of birth missing (living people)